List of major incidents in Denmark where an organized group attempts an act of violence targeting innocents. Dates in boldface are attacks that were carried out, dates without boldface are the date of arrest in plots that were not carried out.

References

Denmark
Terrorist incidents
Crime in Denmark
Denmark-related lists